State symbols may refer to:
National symbols
Australian state symbols
Emblems of Indian states
Indian state symbols
United States state symbols
 in chemistry, the symbols for different states of matter